Redscarhead is a village in the Scottish Borders area of Scotland, off the A703, by the Eddleston Water, and close to Cringletie.

In the village is a memorial to George Meikle Kemp, the architect who designed the Scott Monument in Edinburgh.

See also
List of places in the Scottish Borders
List of places in East Lothian
List of places in Midlothian
List of places in West Lothian

Gallery

External links

RCAHMS: Redscarhead, Commemorative Monument, George Meikle Kemp

Villages in the Scottish Borders